Tom Daugherty (born February 22, 1975) is a right-handed American professional ten-pin bowler residing in Riverview, Florida. He is a member of the Professional Bowlers Association (PBA), having joined in 2001.  He is one of the few PBA bowlers to successfully use the one-handed no-thumb delivery. Although Daugherty has won four PBA Tour titles (including one major) and 21 PBA Regional titles, he is perhaps best known for rolling a nationally-televised 100 game at the 2011 PBA Tournament of Champions, the lowest score ever bowled in a televised PBA event.

Nicknamed "Rebel", Daugherty has accumulated 21 career 300 games in PBA events. He is a pro staff member for Hammer bowling balls, Dexter shoes, and Turbo Inserts.

PBA career
Daugherty became a PBA member in 2001, and started bowling regularly on the PBA Tour in the 2003–04 season.  After three seasons of little success as a full time Tour bowler, he returned to bowling mostly in PBA Regional Tour events for the next six seasons.

The 100 game
By way of his Regional Tour titles, Daugherty made the initial "Champions" field for the 2011 PBA Tournament of Champions. He fought his way into the "Elite" field and made the January 22 televised finals as the #2 seed, where he faced #3 seed Mika Koivuniemi in the semifinal match. Daugherty wound up on the wrong end of PBA history that day, rolling seven splits en route to a record-low 100 score. (The previous low score in a televised PBA Tour event was 129, shot by Steve Jaros in 1992.) With Koivuniemi narrowly missing perfection and bowling a 299 in the same match, Daugherty also became part of the most lopsided match in PBA history (–199 pins). Despite the embarrassment, Daugherty ran around and high-fived the crowd after knocking down the two pins he needed to reach the 100 mark. He cashed $50,000 for his third-place finish, joking after the match, "I made 500 dollars a pin!" In the next season’s Tournament of Champions, Daugherty again made the Elite Field and was candid about the previous year’s debacle:
"That 100 game was the best thing that ever happened to me. I have no problem with it. No one would remember me if I hadn't bowled that game. No one remembers Tom Smallwood and he finished second last year."

Success in 2012
Daugherty returned to full-time touring status in the 2012–13  PBA season. He finally found success, winning his first national PBA Tour title on November 11, 2012 at the PBA Bowlers Journal Scorpion Championship, which was part of that season's World Series of Bowling in Las Vegas.

Additional career highlights
Daugherty finished third at the 2015 PBA Players Championship, his best finish in a major since 2011. He was also a member of the Bass Pro Shops Silver Lake Atom Splitters team, which won the 2015 PBA League Elias Cup team title.

Daugherty made the TV finals for the 2016 PBA Tournament of Champions and the 2016 USBC Masters, but could not complete the quest for a title in either of these major events. He would win his second PBA Tour title on September 10, 2016 at the PBA Wolf Open in Allen Park, Michigan.

Daugherty was again a member of the Silver Lake Atom Splitters team, which won the PBA League title in 2018.

While he didn't win a title in 2019, Daugherty made a career-high 13 match play rounds and cashed a then-career high $75,890 in PBA earnings.

2021: first major title and ESPY award
On March 13, 2021, Daugherty won his third PBA Tour title and first major at the PBA World Championship, the premiere event of World Series of Bowling XII. Having earned the #1 seed for the televised finals, the 46-year old defeated Jakob Butturff in his lone match, 263–257, to capture the title and $100,000 top prize. Four days later, Daugherty won his fourth PBA Tour title in the final event of the World Series. Hours after breaking the hearts of bowling fans by eliminating legends Pete Weber and Walter Ray Williams Jr. from match play, Daugherty topped Kyle Troup in the final match, 266–254, to capture his second career PBA Scorpion Championship. Daugherty and partner BJ Moore also finished second in another World Series of Bowling event, the Roth-Holman PBA Doubles Championship. Over the five-event 2021 World Series of Bowling, Daugherty claimed $139,750 in earnings, easily topping what he had earned in any previous full season of his career.

Based on points earned over the first nine events of the 2021 PBA season, Daugherty qualified as the #3 seed for the 2021 PBA Tour Playoffs. After topping Jason Sterner in the Round of 16, Tom was upset in the Round of 8 by #11 seed Sam Cooley. He would finish the 2021 season third in Tour points and third in earnings ($197,400).

On July 10, 2021, Daugherty was awarded an ESPY for Best Bowler.

PBA Tour titles
Major championships are in bold text.

 2012 PBA Bowlers Journal Scorpion Championship (Las Vegas, Nevada)
 2016 PBA Wolf Open (Allen Park, Michigan)
 2021 PBA Guaranteed Rate World Championship (Tampa, Florida)
 2021 PBA Scorpion Championship (Tampa, Florida)

International competition
Daugherty represented Team USA at the 2021 Weber Cup, an annual USA vs. Europe competition. In the USA's 17–18 loss to Team Europe, Daugherty participated in 11 of 35 matches, going 3–2 in singles, 2–1 in doubles and 0–3 in team.

Personal
Daugherty has three daughters (Camryn and twins Cayce and Courtney) and a son (Kody), all from a previous marriage.  In addition to earning a living on the lanes, he operates two bowling pro shops in the Tampa Bay Area, also running the store online via TDbowling.com.

References

American ten-pin bowling players
1975 births
Living people
People from Riverview, Hillsborough County, Florida
Sportspeople from Hillsborough County, Florida